Laizhou, alternately romanized as Laichow, is a county-level city in the Prefecture-level city of Yantai, Shandong Province, China. As of 2008, Laizhou had a population of 902,000, out of which 188,000 are urban residents.

Laizhou traditionally boasts strong economy due to its abundant natural resources, such as gold, magnesium, granite, and salt. Laizhou produces about 15% of the gold production of the whole nation, around 55,000 pounds annually. It is ranked 37th among the similar size cities in the nation and the top 10 in Shandong Province. In 2010, the GDP of Laizhou reached US$7.3 billion. Laizhou Port is one of the major ports in the Yellow River Delta.

Geography

Laizhou embraces Bohai Bay to its west border and is famous for swimming crabs and razor clams. Claimed as the Capital of the Chinese Rose, Laizhou hosts Chinese Rose Festival on May 25 every year, attracting thousands of visitors. Laizhou is also well known for its creative straw handmade crafts, one of Laizhou's main exporting commodities. Li Denghai, a Laizhou native, is called Godfather of Compact Planting Hybrid Maize for his contribution. Apple orchards and apple seedling nursery are popular in eastern part of Laizhou, led by one of the best apple seedling nurseries in China, Laizhou All Nature Horticultural Nursery in Xiao Caogou Village.

Laizhou No. 1 High School ranks among the top 100 high schools in China, has sent thousands of graduates to top universities all over the nation. Laizhou Martial Arts Institute was selected to participate in the 2008 Beijing Olympic Opening Ceremony.

Over the years, Laizhou has been awarded including:
Top Longevity Cities of China,
Excellent Tourist City in China,
The Happiest City in China,
Nation's Cleanest City,
Best Corn Seed Region in China,
Capital of Handmade Straw Crafts in China,

Administrative divisions
As 2012, this city is divided to 5 subdistricts and 11 towns.
Subdistricts

Towns

Climate

Transport
Laizhou railway station (Shandong), a station on the under construction Tianjin–Weifang–Yantai high-speed railway.

See also
Laizhou Bay
Nanjusi, a village in Chengguo, Laizhou

References

External links
 Official Laizhou website in English

Cities in Shandong
Yantai